Cosmos-2445 was launched from the Plesetsk Cosmodrome on a Soyuz-U rocket on November 14, 2008. It is an optical reconnaissance Spacecraft of the Yantar-4K2M class. It re-entered on February 23, 2009, after 102 days in space It broke into two fragments that burned up later on in the re-entry sequence.

See also

Soyuz-U
Roscosmos State Corporation

References

Spacecraft launched in 2008
Spacecraft launched by Soyuz-U rockets
Spacecraft which reentered in 2009